Jeff Bright (born 7 May 1985) is an Australian footballer who currently plays for Cockburn City. Jeff spent 2010 at Dandenong Thunder in the VPL. He played 2 games for Perth Glory in the Hyundai A-League.
https://www.ultimatealeague.com/player/?player_id=377

References

External links
 Perth Glory profile

1985 births
Living people
Australian soccer players
A-League Men players
Perth Glory FC players
Association football fullbacks